555 (five hundred [and] fifty-five) is the natural number following 554 and preceding 556.

In mathematics 
It is a sphenic number. In base 10, it is a repdigit, and because it is divisible by the sum of its digits, it is a Harshad number. It is also a Harshad number in binary, base 11, base 13 and hexadecimal.

555 is the sum of the first three-digit permutable primes 113, 131 and 311.

Telephone numbers
The NANP reserves telephone numbers in many dialing areas in the 555 local block for fictional purposes, such as 1-308-555-3485.

Numerology and Spirituality 
In numerology and New Age spirituality, the number 555 is considered an angel number, which is a symbol that conveys messages from one's spirit guides, or the metaphysical world. Some of the meanings applied to the 555 angel number are derived from the 6th century BCE philosopher Pythagoras, who believed in the sacred power of numbers, as well as from other esoteric beliefs, including numerology, astrology, and the tarot. While meanings vary depending on the interpreter, the angel number 555 is generally associated with change, transformation, healing, and good luck.

External links 
 

Integers